Panama competed at the 1984 Summer Olympics in Los Angeles, United States. The nation returned to the Olympic Games after participating in the American-led boycott of the 1980 Summer Olympics. Eight competitors, seven men and one woman, took part in ten events in five sports.

Athletics

Florencio Aguilar
Alfonso Pitters

Fencing

One female fencer represented Panama in 1984.

Women's foil
 Barbra Higgins

Swimming

Men's 100m Breaststroke
Manuel Gutiérrez
 Heat — 1:06.07 (→ did not advance, 26th place)

Men's 200m Breaststroke
Manuel Gutiérrez
 Heat — 2:23.02
 B-Final — 2:23.13 (→ 16th place)

Men's 200m Individual Medley
Manuel Gutiérrez
 Heat — DSQ (→ did not advance, no ranking)

Weightlifting

José Díaz López
Tómas Rodríguez
Ricardo Salas

Wrestling

Saúl Leslie

References

External links
Official Olympic Reports

Nations at the 1984 Summer Olympics
1984
1984 in Panamanian sport